Riera may refer to:

People
Albert Riera (b. 1982), a Spanish retired footballer who last played for Espanyol, Liverpool and Galatasaray
Arnau Riera (b. 1981), a Spanish retired footballer who played for Sunderland
Carme Riera (b. 1948), a Spanish novelist and essayist
Fernando Riera (1920 - 2010), a Chilean former football player and manager
Gabi Riera, an Andorran football player
Marieta Riera (b. 1963), a Venezuelan former athlete who specialised in the javelin throw 
Oriol Riera (b. 1986), Spanish former footballer and current assistant manager of AD Alcorcón B
Rodrigo Riera (1923 – 1999), a Venezuelan guitarist and composer
Sito Riera (b. 1987), a Spanish footballer who plays for Enosis Neon Paralimni FC
Teresa Riera (b. 1950), a Spanish politician and Member of the European Parliament

Places
 La Riera, Cangas de Onís, in Asturias, Spain
 La Riera de Gaià, in Catalonia
 La Riera (Colunga), in Asturias, Spain
 Sa Riera, in Catalonia

Other
Palacio del Marqués de Casa Riera, a former palace in Madrid